Naharkatia Assembly constituency is one of the 126 assembly constituencies of  Assam a north east state of India. Naharkatia is also part of Dibrugarh Lok Sabha constituency.

Members of Legislative Assembly

 1978: Sasha Kamal Handique, Communist Party of India (Marxist)
 1985: Kusumbar Tairai, Independent
 1991: Sasha Kamal Handique, Communist Party of India (Marxist)
 1996: Pranati Phukan, Indian National Congress
 2000: Pranati Phukan, Indian National Congress
 2001: Pranati Phukan, Indian National Congress
 2006: Pranati Phukan, Indian National Congress
 2011: Pranati Phukan, Indian National Congress
 2016: Naren Sonowal, Asom Gana Parishad
 2021: Taranga Gogoi, Bharatiya Janata Party

Election results

2016 results

2011 results

See also

 Naharkatia
 List of constituencies of Assam Legislative Assembly

References

External links 
 

Assembly constituencies of Assam
Dibrugarh
Dibrugarh district